Between 1916 and 1995, the Kor Royal Cup was the top level of club football competition. In 1996 the Thai Premier League (official name: Johnnie Walker Thailand Soccer League) was established by the Football Association of Thailand, sponsored by whiskey manufacturing brand Johnnie Walker.

In its first season, 1996/97, the Thai Premier League consisted of 18 teams from the Kor Royal Cup. Top 4 teams in the final league table would be qualified for championship playoffs, and six teams at the bottom of the league table would be relegated to the Thailand Division 1 League which was to be created next season (1997).

The defending Champions of the Kor Royal Cup, Thai Farmers Bank FC, would enter the next edition of the Asian Club Championship.

Member clubs locations

Bangkok Bank
Bangkok Bank of Commerce
Krung Thai Bank
Osotsapa M-150
Port Authority of Thailand
UCOM Raj Pracha
Rajvithi-Agfatech
Royal Thai Air Force
Royal Thai Army
Royal Thai Navy
Royal Thai Police
Singha Tero Sasana
Singha-Thamrongthai
Sinthana
Stock Exchange of Thailand
Thai Farmers Bank
Thailand Tobacco Monopoly
TOT

Final league table

Championship playoff 

Top 4 of the league (Thai Farmers Bank, TOT, Bangkok Bank, Stock Exchange of Thailand) qualified for championship playoff.

Semifinals 
February 23, 1997

Final 
March 16, 1997

† Champions : Bangkok Bank (Qualification for the Asian Club Championship).

Season notes 
 The league will be reduced in size to consist of only 12 teams for season 1997.  The competing clubs will be: Bangkok Bank, Stock Exchange of Thailand, Thai Farmers Bank FC, TOT, Royal Thai Army, Royal Thai Air Force, Sinthana, UCOM-Rajpracha, Royal Thai Navy, Port Authority BEC Tero Sasana and Royal Thai Police.
 Another six teams, who failed to make it into the top 12 elite, Thailand Tobacco Monopoly, Osotsapa, Bangkok Bank of Commerce, Raj Vithi, Krung Thai Bank and Thamrongthai will join the top four teams from the old second division - Rayong, Samut Prakan, Royal Household Bureau and Bank for Agriculture and Co-Operatives - to make up a new second tier. It was also confirmed that there will be no play-offs for the championship this year and just one team will go either down to the Second Division and up to the first. However, the second bottom team in the top division will have to face. The second placed team in the second division to decide who takes up a place in the top 12 next year.

Asian Representation

 Thai Farmers Bank represented Thailand in the 1996–97 Asian Club Championship, where they would reach the second round, where they were beaten by eventual winners Pohang Steelers of South Korea.

Annual awards

Coach of the Year 
 Withaya Laohakul - Bangkok Bank

Player of the Year 
 Amporn Amparnsuwan - TOT

Top scorer 
 Amporn Amparnsuwan - 21 Goals TOT

Champions
The league champion was Bangkok Bank. It was the team's first title.

References 

 Thailand 1996/97 RSSSF

External links 
 Official Website

Thai League 1 seasons
Thailand
1996 in Thai football
1997 in Thai football